The men's 400m freestyle events at the 2019 World Para Swimming Championships were held in the London Aquatics Centre at the Queen Elizabeth Olympic Park in London between 9–15 September.

Medalists

Results

S6

S7

S8

S9

S10

S11

S13

References

2019 World Para Swimming Championships